Sentani Kota is a village (kelurahan) located in district of Sentani, Jayapura Regency, Papua Province, Indonesia. It is the administrative seat of Sentani District, while Sentani District is the capital Jayapura Regency. The village is located to the north of Lake Sentani and to the south of the Cyclops Mountains.

Transportation
Sentani is served by Sentani International Airport. The village is linked to Jayapura by a paved highway.

Climate
Sentani has a tropical rainforest climate (Af) with moderate to heavy rainfall year-round.

References

Populated places in Papua (province)